Timothy James Bottoms (born August 30, 1951) is an American actor and film producer. He is best known for playing the lead in Johnny Got His Gun (1971); Sonny Crawford in The Last Picture Show (1971), where he and his fellow co-stars, Cybill Shepherd and Jeff Bridges, rose to fame; and as James Hart, the first-year law student who battles with Prof. Kingsfield, in the film adaptation The Paper Chase (1973). He is also known for playing the main antagonist in the disaster film Rollercoaster (1977) and for playing President George W. Bush multiple times, including on the sitcom That's My Bush!, the comedy film The Crocodile Hunter: Collision Course and the docudrama DC 9/11: Time of Crisis.

Early life
Bottoms was born in Santa Barbara, California, the eldest of four sons of Betty (née Chapman) and James "Bud" Bottoms, a sculptor and art teacher.

He graduated from Santa Barbara High School in 1970, where he had been a member of the swimming team. During his time there he gained acting and singing experience during various theater productions.

Career
Bottoms made his film debut in 1971 as Joe Bonham in Dalton Trumbo's Johnny Got His Gun. The same year, he appeared alongside his brother Sam in The Last Picture Show. (He portrayed the same character in the 1990 sequel Texasville). In 1973's The Paper Chase, he starred as Harvard law student Hart facing the fearsome Professor Kingsfield (John Houseman).  Among the other films he has appeared in are Love and Pain and the Whole Damn Thing (1973), The Crazy World of Julius Vrooder (1974), Operation Daybreak (1975), A Small Town in Texas (1976), Rollercoaster (1977) Hurricane (1979), Invaders from Mars (1986) and Elephant (2003).

As a result of both a physical resemblance to  U.S. President George W. Bush and an ability to impersonate his voice, Bottoms has portrayed Bush in three widely varying productions. In 2000 and 2001, he played a parody of Bush in the Comedy Central sitcom That's My Bush!; he subsequently appeared as Bush in a cameo appearance in the family film The Crocodile Hunter: Collision Course. Finally, following the September 11 attacks, Bottoms once again played Bush, this time in a serious fashion, in the TV film DC 9/11: Time of Crisis, one of the first films to be based upon the attacks.

During an episode of the Fox television show That '70s Show in which a tornado warning has been issued and the students of the high school are trapped, Bottoms is seen as the panicking principal. He appeared in a recurring role during the first season of the FX series Dirt as Gibson Horne, owner of the magazine for whom the main character Lucy Spiller, played by Courteney Cox, worked.

He also co-produced the documentary Picture This – The Times of Peter Bogdanovich in Archer City, Texas (1991), a behind-the-scenes work about the making of the films The Last Picture Show and Texasville. In the documentary, he revealed that he had a crush on his co-star Cybill Shepherd during The Last Picture Show, but she did not reciprocate his romantic feelings, even though she said in a separate interview that she found him "very attractive". He was also heavily featured in the Metallica video for "One", which featured footage of the film Johnny Got His Gun.

Personal life
He is the eldest brother of actors Joseph Bottoms (born 1954), Sam Bottoms (1955–2008) and Ben Bottoms (born 1960). In 1967, Bottoms toured Europe as part of the Santa Barbara Madrigal Society.

Sam Bottoms died from brain cancer in 2008. At one point, Sam was the only sibling close to Timothy. 

Bottoms has been married twice, first to singer Alicia Cory in 1975.  They had a son, Bartholomew, before divorcing in 1982.  His marriage to Marcia Morehart in 1984 produced three children: Bodie, Bridget, and Benton.

Filmography

Film

	
 Johnny Got His Gun (1971) as Joe Bonham	
 The Last Picture Show (1971) as Sonny Crawford
 Love and Pain and the Whole Damn Thing (1973) as Walter Elbertson
 The Paper Chase (1973) as Hart
 The White Dawn (1974) as Daggett
 The Crazy World of Julius Vrooder (1974) as Vrooder
 Operation Daybreak (1975) as Jan Kubis
 A Small Town in Texas (1976) as Poke Jackson
 Rollercoaster (1977) as Young Man
 The Other Side of the Mountain Part 2 (1978) as John Boothe
 Hurricane (1979) as Jack Sanford
 The High Country (1981) as Jim
 Tin Man (1983) as Casey
 Hambone and Hillie (1983) as Michael Radcliffe
 The Census Taker (1984) as Pete
 What Waits Below (1984) as Maj. Elbert Stevens
 The Sea Serpent (aka Serpiente de Mar) (1985) as Pedro Fontán
 In the Shadow of Kilimanjaro (1986) as Jack Ringtree
 Invaders from Mars (1986) as George Gardner
 The Fantasist (1986) as Danny Sullivan
 Mio min Mio (Mio in the Land of Faraway) (1987) as The King
 The Drifter (1988) as Arthur
 Return from the River Kwai (1989) as Seaman Miller
 A Case of Honor (1989) as Sgt. Joseph 'Hard' Case
 Istanbul (1989) as Frank
 Texasville (1990) as Sonny Crawford	
 Digger (1993) as Sam Corlett
 Blue Sky (1994) as Owens Ranch Cowboy (uncredited)
 Ava's Magical Adventure (1994) as Slayton
 Ill Met by Moonlight (1994) as Egeus
 Horses and Champions (1994) as Ben Choice
 Top Dog (1995) as Nelson Houseman
 Ripper Man (1995) as Charles Walkan
 Hourglass (1995) as Jurgen Brauner
 Desperate Obsession (1995)
 American Hero (1995, Video Game) as Jack Armstrong
 Lone Tiger (1996) as Marcus
 Total Force (1996) as Drake
 Uncle Sam (1996) as Donald Crandall
  (1996) as Clay
 The Prince (1996) as John
 Absolute Force (1997) as Lt. John Drake
 Tiger (1997) as Larry
 Mr. Atlas (1997) as Phillip Frodden
 The Man in the Iron Mask (1998) as Fouquet
 Mixed Blessings (1998) as Carl Weaver
 Diamondbacks (1998) as Ed Williams
 The Waterfront (1998) as Salvatore Solleto
 No Rest for the Wicked (1998) as Father Jeremy
 The Prince and the Surfer (1999) as Johnny Canty (uncredited)
 The Boy with the X-Ray Eyes (1999) as John Carver
 Black Sea 213 (2000) as Dean
 The Hiding Place (2000) as Jack
 Held for Ransom (2000) as Fred Donovan
 The Crocodile Hunter: Collision Course (2002) as President George Walker Bush (uncredited)
 Elephant (2003) as Mr. McFarland
 The Entrepreneurs (2003) as Rotunno
 The Girl Next Door (2004) as Mr. Kidman
 Illusion Infinity (a.k.a. Paradise, 2004) as Francis / Douglas / Henry / Patricia's Father / Older Alan
 Pocket Angel (2004)
 Paradise, Texas (2005) as Mack Cameron
 Shanghai Kiss (2007) as Adelaide's Father
 Along the Way (2007) as Michael McCaffery
 Chinaman's Chance: America's Other Slaves (2008) as Thomas
 Parasomnia (2008) as Dr. Emil Corso
  (2008) (original title: Chinaman's Chance)
 An American Girl: Chrissa Stands Strong (2009) as Paul Maxwell
 Call of the Wild (2009) as Heep
 The Land That Time Forgot (2009) as Captain Burroughs
 Pound of Flesh (2010) as Cameron Morris
 Hello Stranger (2011) as Sheriff
 1 Nighter (2012) as Louie
 Realm of the Mole Men (2012) as Willy
 Welcome to the Men's Group (2016) as Larry
 Railroad to Hell: A Chinaman's Chance (2018) as Thomas
 The Shed (2019) as Ellis

Television

 Look Homeward, Angel (1972, TV Movie) as Eugene Gant
 Winesburg, Ohio (1973)
 The Story of David (1976, TV Movie) as David
 The Moneychangers (1976, TV Mini-Series) as Miles Eastin
 The Gift of Love (1978, TV Movie) as Rudi Miller
 A Shining Season (1979, TV Movie) as John Baker
 Escape (1980, TV Movie) as Dwight Worker
 East of Eden (1981, TV Mini-Series) as Adam Trask
 Love Leads the Way: A True Story (1984, TV Movie) as Morris Frank
 Perry Mason: The Case of the Notorious Nun (1986, TV Movie) as Father Thomas O'Neil
 The Hitchhiker (1987, TV Series) as Peter
 Island Sons (1987, TV Movie) as Tim Faraday
 The Twilight Zone (1988, Episode: "The Hellgramite Method") as Miley Judson
 Freddy's Nightmares (1989, TV Series) as Mr. Franklin
 The Ray Bradbury Theater (1990, Episode: "Here There Be Tygers") as Driscoll
 Land of the Lost (1991, TV Series) as Tom Porter
 500 Nations (1995, TV Mini-Series) (voice)
 Yakuza Connection (1995, TV Movie) as Ward Derderian
 Personal Vendetta (1995, TV Movie) as Zach Blackwell
 Death Game (1997, TV Movie) as Jack
 Murder Seen (2000, TV Movie) as Detective Stepnoski
 Gideon's Crossing (2000, TV Series) as Rev. Chuck
 That's My Bush! (2001, TV Series) as George W. Bush
 That '70s Show (2002, TV Series) as Vice Principal Cole
 DC 9/11: Time of Crisis (2003, TV Movie) as President George W. Bush
 Ike: Countdown to D-Day (2004, TV Movie) as Walter Bedell "Beetle" Smith
 NCIS: Naval Criminal Investigative Service (2004, TV Series) as Ritt Everett
 Jane Doe: Now You See It, Now You Don't (2005, TV Movie) as Clarence
 Vampire Bats (2005, TV Movie) as Hank Poelker
 Grey's Anatomy (2005, TV Series) as Carl Murphy
 Deceit (2006, TV Movie) as Martin Ford
 Dirt (2007, TV Series) as Gibson Horne
 Holiday in Handcuffs (2007, TV Movie) as Dad Chandler 
 Deadly Suspicion (2008, TV Movie) as Sheriff Carl Lovett
 Lone Rider (2008, TV Movie) as Gus
 Bound by a Secret (2009, TV Movie) as Will Hutchinson

Video game
 Fox Hunt (1996) as Frank
 American Hero (shot in 1995, cancelled in 1997, and finally released in 2021) as Jack Armstrong

Producer
 Picture This: The Times of Peter Bogdanovich in Archer City, Texas (1991)

References

External links
 
 
 

1951 births
American male film actors
American male television actors
Living people
Male actors from Santa Barbara, California
20th-century American male actors
21st-century American male actors